Southdale   is a neighbourhood located between the neighbourhoods of Woodside  and Manor Park in the community of Dartmouth, in the  Halifax Regional Municipality, Nova Scotia. The primary street is Portland Street which forms part of Route 207. A small lake  called Maynard Lake is located within  the  neighbourhood .

Schools
Dartmouth South Academy

Communities in Halifax, Nova Scotia

Dartmouth, Nova Scotia